Giuseppe Zanardelli (29 October 1826  26 December 1903) was an Italian jurist and political figure. He served as the Prime Minister of Italy from 15 February 1901 to 3 November 1903. An eloquent orator, he was also a Grand Master freemason. Zanardelli, representing the bourgeoisie from Lombardy, personified the classical 19th-century liberalism, committed to suffrage expansion, anticlericalism, civil liberties, free trade and laissez-faire economics. Throughout his long political career, he was among the most ardent advocates of freedom of conscience and divorce.

Early life

Giuseppe Zanardelli was born in Brescia (Lombardy) on 29 October 1826. He was a combatant in the volunteer corps during the First Italian War of Independence of 1848 between the Austrian Empire and the Kingdom of Sardinia, within the era of Italian unification (Risorgimento). After the lost battle of Novara he went to Pisa to study law, and he returned to Brescia to become a barrister. For a time earned a livelihood by teaching law, but was molested by the Austrian police and forbidden to teach in consequence of his refusal to contribute pro-Austrian articles to the press.

In 1859 he was forced to flee to Switzerland. He moved to Lugano, but returned in time to organize the insurrection of Brescia in the Second Italian War of Independence and welcomed Giuseppe Garibaldi in the city. Enlisted in the Cacciatori delle Alpi (Hunters of the Alps), he remained in the area until the armistice of Villafranca. With the annexation of Lombardy to Piedmont, he was elected to Parliament in Turin.

Elected deputy in 1859, he received various administrative appointments, but only attained a political office in 1876 when the Left, of which he had been a prominent and influential member, came into power. Zanardelli became a freemason in 1860; he was initiated in the Lodge "Propaganda" of Rome.

In government
In 1876 he became Minister of Public Works in the first government of Agostino Depretis, and Minister of the Interior in the government of Benedetto Cairoli in 1878. In the latter capacity, he drafted the franchise reform, but created dissatisfaction by the indecision of his administrative acts, particularly in regard to the Irredentist agitation, and by his theory of repressing and not in any way preventing crime, which led for a time to an epidemic of murders.

Overthrown with Cairoli in December 1878, he returned to power as Minister of Justice in 1881 with the Depretis government, and succeeded in completing the commercial code. He also was the architect of the electoral reform in 1892 which lowered the voting age from 25 to 21, and reduced the minimum tax threshold for voting or allowed an elementary school certificate.

Abandoned awhile by Depretis in 1883, he remained in opposition until 1887, when he again joined Depretis as Minister of Justice, retaining his portfolio throughout the ensuing government of Francesco Crispi, until 31 January 1891. During this period he began the reform of the magistracy and promulgated a new penal code, which unified penal legislation in Italy, abolished capital punishment and recognised the workers right to strike. The code was regarded as a great work by contemporary European jurists.

After the fall of the government of Giovanni Giolitti in 1893, Zanardelli made a strenuous but unsuccessful attempt to form an administration. Elected president of the chamber in 1894 and 1896, he exercised that office with ability until, in December 1897, he accepted the Ministry of Justice in the government of Antonio di Rudinì, only to resign in the following spring on account of dissensions with his colleague, Emilio, marquis Visconti-Venosta, over the measures necessary to prevent a recurrence of the Bava-Beccaris massacre of May 1898.

Prime minister
Returning to the presidency of the chamber, he again abandoned his post in order to associate himself with the obstructionist campaign against the Public Safety Bill (1899–1900) restricting political activity and free speech, which was introduced by the government of general Luigi Pelloux. He was rewarded by being enabled to form an administration with the support of the Extreme Left upon the fall of the government of Giuseppe Saracco in February 1901. Giolitti became Minister of the Interior in the administration of Zanardelli, and became its real head.

Zanardelli focused his attention on the issue of the South: in September 1902 he undertook a journey through Basilicata, as one of the poorest regions in Italy, to see for himself the problems in the Mezzogiorno. Zanardelli was unable to achieve much during his last term of office, as his health was greatly impaired. His proposed Divorce Bill, although voted in the chamber, had to be withdrawn on account of the strong opposition of the country. He retired from the administration on 21 October 1903, and Giolitti succeeded him as Prime Minister. Tired and ill, he died in Maderno on 26 December 1903.

In popular culture
On 15 September 1902, Zanardelli stayed at the Imperial Hotel Tramontano, owned by the Commendator Guglielmo Baron Tramontano of Sorrento, who was also the mayor of the city Sorrento. Baron Guglielmo Tramontano asked the musician brothers Giambattista and Ernesto De Curtis to compose and write a song in honour of Zanardelli, and the result became the famous Neapolitan song "Torna a Surriento" (Come Back to Sorrento).

Honours
 : Knight of the Order of the Black Eagle – August 1902 – during the visit to Germany of King Victor Emmanuel III of Italy.
 : Grand Cordon of the Order of Osmanieh – September 1902 – during the visit to Constantinople of an Italian Regia Marina squadron.
 : Grand Cross of the Legion d'Honneur – November 1902 – ″in testimony of the good relations between France and Italy″.

References

Sources:
 De Grand, Alexander J. (2001). The hunchback's tailor: Giovanni Giolitti and liberal Italy from the challenge of mass politics to the rise of fascism, 1882–1922, Greenwood.
 Sarti, Roland (2004). Italy: a reference guide from the Renaissance to the present, New York: Facts on File Inc., 
 Seton-Watson, Christopher (1967). Italy from liberalism to fascism, 1870–1925, New York: Taylor & Francis, 
 
 The above Chiraini publication is referenced by

External links 

1826 births
1903 deaths
People from Brescia
People of the Kingdom of Lombardy–Venetia
Politicians of Lombardy
Historical Left politicians
Dissident Left politicians
Prime Ministers of Italy
Zanardelli Cabinet
Italian Ministers of the Interior
Presidents of the Chamber of Deputies (Italy)
Deputies of Legislature VIII of the Kingdom of Italy
Deputies of Legislature IX of the Kingdom of Italy
Deputies of Legislature X of the Kingdom of Italy
Deputies of Legislature XI of the Kingdom of Italy
Deputies of Legislature XII of the Kingdom of Italy
Deputies of Legislature XIII of the Kingdom of Italy
Deputies of Legislature XIV of the Kingdom of Italy
Deputies of Legislature XV of the Kingdom of Italy
Deputies of Legislature XVI of the Kingdom of Italy
Deputies of Legislature XVII of the Kingdom of Italy
Deputies of Legislature XVIII of the Kingdom of Italy
Deputies of Legislature XIX of the Kingdom of Italy
Deputies of Legislature XX of the Kingdom of Italy
Deputies of Legislature XXI of the Kingdom of Italy
Italian Freemasons
Honorary Knights Grand Cross of the Royal Victorian Order
Politicians awarded knighthoods